Hiroe Amano is a former badminton player of Japan.

Hiroe won several international and national titles in the 1960s. She was among the most notable of a cadre of fine players who helped Japan to win the Uber Cup (women's world team) competitions in 1966 and in 1969. In 1978 she was the coach of the successful Japanese Uber Cup team.

References 

Living people
Japanese female badminton players
Asian Games medalists in badminton
Badminton players at the 1966 Asian Games
Asian Games gold medalists for Japan
Asian Games silver medalists for Japan
Medalists at the 1966 Asian Games
1943 births
20th-century Japanese women